Nana is a given name that has different origins in several countries across the world. Its use as a feminine or masculine name varies culturally. It is feminine in Japan, Georgia and Greece, and it is masculine in Ethiopia and India, and epicene (unisex/gender neutral) in Ghana and Indonesia. In Georgia, Nana is the fifth most popular given name for girls. In Ghana, among the Akan people, particularly the Akyem, Ashanti and Akuapim peoples, Nana is used as the title of a monarch to signify their status. Furthermore, the stool name of kings and queens is always preceded by Nana. Non-royal Ghanaian people also use Nana as a given name. In some cases, they may adopt the name Nana, if they have been named after a monarch. In Ghana, one can respectfully refer to a King or Queen as Nana without mentioning their full name; much like using "Your Highness".
In India, nana means father in Telugu language and grandpa in Hindi and Urdu language from mother side.

People

Acting
 Nana Bryant (1888–1955), an American film actress
 Nana Eikura (born 1988), a Japanese model and actress
 Nana Jorjadze (born 1948), a Georgian film director and scriptwriter
 Nana Katase (born 1981), a Japanese actress
 Nana Komatsu (born 1996), a Japanese model and actress
 Nana Ama McBrown (born 1980), a Ghanaian actress
 Nana Ozaki (actress), a Japanese actress
 Nana Palsikar (1907–1984), an Indian film actor
 Nana Patekar (born 1951), an Indian actor and filmmaker
 Nana Visitor (born 1957), an American actress
 Nana Yamaguchi (born 1938), a Japanese voice actress
 Nana Yanagisawa (born 1987), a Japanese actress and fashion model

Art
 Nana Haruta (born 1985), a Japanese manga artist
 Nana Meskhidze (1936–1997), a Georgian artist-painter

Music
 Nana Caymmi (born 1941), Brazilian singer
 Nana Aboagye Dacosta (born 1957), Ghanaian musician
 Nana Hedin (born 1968), Swedish singer
 Nana Kitade (born 1987), Japanese J-Rock singer
 Nana Mizuki (born 1980), Japanese voice actress and singer
 Nana Mouskouri (born 1934), Greek singer
 Nana Okada (singer, born 1959), Japanese idol and actress
 Nana Okada (born 1997), Japanese idol and member of the groups AKB48 & STU48
 Nana Kwame Abrokwa (born 1968), German rapper and DJ
 Nana Tanimura (born 1987), Japanese pop singer
 Naná Vasconcelos (1944-2016), Brazilian Latin jazz percussionist, vocalist and berimbau player

Politics
 Nana Akufo-Addo, President of the Republic of Ghana 
 Nana (Apache) (1800?-1896), a Chiricahua Apache leader
 Nana Effah-Apenteng, the Permanent Representative of Ghana to the United Nations
 Nana Fadnavis (1742–1800), an influential minister and statesman of the Maratha Empire in Pune, India
 Nana of Iberia, a 4th-century Georgian queen 
 Nana Olomu (1852–1916), an Itsekiri chief and merchant from the Niger Delta region of southern Nigeria
 Nana Osei Bonsu II (born 1939), the regent of the Ashanti Kingdom
 Nana Owusu-Nsiah, a Ghanaian diplomat and ambassador
 Nana Patil (1900-1976), an Indian independence activist
 Nana Sahib (1824-?), an Indian leader during the rebellion of 1857 
 Nana Sir Ofori Atta I (born 1881-1943), a King of Akyem Abuakwa in 1912
 Nana Kofi Twumasi-Ankrah (born 1979), Equerry to Queen Elizabeth II

Religion
 Nana of Pécs, a 12th-century bishop in the Kingdom of Hungary
 Nana Dharmadhikari (1922–2008), an Indian spiritual guru

Sports
 Nana Alexandria (born 1949), a Georgian chess Grandmaster
 Nana Arhin Duah (born 1980), a Ghanaian football player
 Nana Attakora (born 1989), a Canadian football player 
 Nana Eshun (born 1969), a Ghanaian football player 
 Nana Eshun (footballer, born 1982), a Ghanaian football player
 Nana Falemi, a Romanian-Cameroonian football player
, Japanese ice hockey player
, Japanese woman footballer
 Nana Ioseliani (born 1962), a Georgian chess player
 Nana Iwasaka (born 1990), a Japanese volleyball player
 Nana Joshi (1926–1987), a cricketer
 Nana Konadu (born 1964), a retired Ghanaian boxer 
 Nana Kuffour (born 1985), a Ghanaian-American soccer player
 Nana Miyagi (born 1971), a Japanese American tennis player
 Nana Ofori-Twumasi (born 1990), a professional Ghanaian-born English footballer
 Nana Takeda (born 1988), a Japanese figure skater

Other
 Nana Asma’u (1793–1864), a poet, teacher and a revered figure in northern Nigeria
 Nana Chudasama, an eminent jurist, former mayor and Sheriff of Mumbai
 Nana Nánabeszter, a 13th century Hungarian nobleman and soldier
 Nana Natsume (born 1980), a Japanese former AV idol and celebrity
 Nana Ozaki, a Japanese gravure idol

Fictional characters 
 Nana Dawson, a character in Heroes
 Nana Komatsu (Nana), a character in the Japanese manga Nana
 Nana McQueen, a character in Hollyoaks
 Nana Moon, a character in the popular British BBC soap opera EastEnders
 Nana Osaki, a character in the Japanese manga Nana
 Nana Oyl, the mother of cartoon character Olive Oyl
 Nana, the Newfoundland dog nurse of Wendy, John and Michael in Peter Pan
 Nana, the protagonist of Émile Zola's novel, Nana
 Nana, a character in the Elfen Lied series
 Nana Shimura, a character in the popular Japanese manga, My Hero Academia
 Nana, one of the two playable characters in the video game Ice Climber
 Nana, a rabbit character from Cyborg Kuro-chan 
 Nana Hiiragi, the protagonist in the Japanese manga, Talentless Nana 
 Nana, a character in the novel Transcendent Kingdom by Yaa Gyasi.  
 Nana Sunohara, a character from the Japanese manga Miss Caretaker of Sunohara-sou
 Nana Daiba, a character in the Revue Starlight franchise

References 

Georgian feminine given names
Japanese feminine given names
Indian masculine given names
Ghanaian culture
Akan given names
Greek feminine given names